The Government of the Democratic Republic of the Congo is the second institution in the central executive branch of the Democratic Republic of the Congo, the first institution being the President, who has the title of head of state.

Description 
Under the constitution of the Third Republic, the government is composed of a cabinet of ministers, deputy-ministers (vice-ministers), and occasionally state-ministers (which is a senior personal honorific title). The number of these ministers vary from one government to the next.

The cabinet is headed by the Prime Minister, also known as the head of government, appointed by the President, from the political party, the group or the coalition that holds the majority of seats in the National Assembly.

In the Democratic Republic of the Congo, the cabinet is more commonly simply referred to as The Government.

The government is the effective executive arm of the state, in charge of all the country's main administration, in all the domains reserved to the central government by the constitution, and in all the domains in which the central government has concurrent jurisdiction with the provinces. 

The government is accountable to the Parliament. Any individual member of the government, as well the entire government, can be censored by its lower-chamber, the National Assembly, through the vote of a motion of censure, or a motion of no-confidence. When the Prime minister is censured, the entire government is asked to step down.

Current government 
The current government is the Lukonde government, under the leadership of Prime Minister Jean-Michel Sama Lukonde. Lukonde assumed office on 15 February 2021, and announced his cabinet on 12 April 2021.

Governments since 2003
 Transitional Government of the Democratic Republic of the Congo (July 2003 - December 2006)
 First Gizenga government (30 December 2006 - 25 November 2007)
 Second Gizenga government (25 November 2007 - 10 October 2008)
 First Muzito government (26 October 2008 - 19 February 2010)
 Second Muzito government (19 February 2010 - 11 September 2011)
 Third Muzito government (11 September 2011 - 6 March 2012)
 Matata government (6 March 2012 - 7 December 2014)
 Second Matata government (7 December 2014 - 14 November 2016)
 Badibanga government (19 December 2016 - 9 May 2017)
 Tshibala government (9 May 2017 - 6 September 2019)
 Ilunga government (6 September 2019 - 26 April 2021)
 Lukonde government (12 April 2021 - )

See also 
 Heads of state of the Democratic Republic of the Congo
 Prime Minister of the Democratic Republic of the Congo

Notes and references

External links
Official sites
  The President of the Republic
  Ministers and Deputy-ministers - At the site of the President of the Democratic Republic of the Congo
  Ministry of the Environment 
  Ministry of Public Health
  Ministère of Finance
  Ministry of mining
Other sites
  Governments on the Congo (Democratic Republic)
  Chiefs of State and Cabinet Members of Foreign Governments: Congo, Democratic Republic of the
  Composition du gouvernement de la République démocratique du Congo, Ministre des Affaires étrangères, France
  Description du noyau du mobutisme et la liste de tous ses gouvernements de 60 à 90, deboutcongolais.info
Gizenga Government
  Publication de la liste des membres du gouvernement Gizenga 1, digitalcongo.net
  La composition du nouveau gouvernement de la RDC connue 

(Much of this page is translated from the French Wikipedia version of this article)